"Fools Fall in Love" is a song by Jerry Leiber and Mike Stoller. It was originally recorded by the Drifters, who took it to number 10 on the R&B chart in 1957. The song reached number 69 on the Billboard Hot 100.

Jacky Ward version
In 1977, "Fools Fall in Love" was recorded by Jacky Ward. His version reached number 9 on the US country music chart and number 16 on the Canadian country chart.

Other versions
Sammy Turner recorded a version in 1960.
Elvis Presley recorded a more up-tempo version on May 28, 1966.  His rendition, charting in tandem with "Indescribably Blue", reached #number 11 in Australia.   Elvis's cover also reached number 102 in the U.S. as a separate B-side.
Two renditions, one upbeat and one torch ballad, were included in the musical revue, Smokey Joe's Cafe, a jukebox musical of songs by Jerry Leiber and Mike Stoller.
John Pizzarelli recorded an up-tempo jazz version in 1994.
Ally McBeal featured a ballad version of the song sung by Jennifer Holliday in the second-season episode "Fools Night Out".

References

The Drifters songs
Elvis Presley songs
Songs written by Jerry Leiber and Mike Stoller
1957 songs
1957 singles
1966 singles
Atlantic Records singles
RCA Victor singles